Colonel Milton Alexander McRae (July 13, 1858 – October 11, 1930) was an American newspaper publisher who co-founded the Scripps-McRae League of Newspapers (now Scripps-Howard) and United Press International. The son of Helen and Duncan Van McRae, he was born in Detroit, Michigan in the United States.

Background
McRae attended the Detroit Public Schools and attended but did not graduate from Detroit Medical College.

In 1883, while serving as advertising manager of The Cincinnati Post, McRae met thirty-year-old E. W. Scripps, who had taken over as managing editor. The two began a business relationship that would last for many years.

In 1887, Scripps made McRae the managing director of the St. Louis Chronicle, a paper Scripps had purchased in 1880. In 1889, Scripps brought McRae on as a partner, and in 1894, together with Scripps and his half-brother George, McRae founded the Scripps-McRae League of Newspapers.

In 1907, the Scripps-McRae League of newspapers combined three regional press associations into the United Press Association.

McRae was President of the Detroit Board of Commerce from 1911 to 1912. He became the third National president of the Boy Scouts of America upon the death of James J. Storrow in 1926.

Works

See also 
 E. W. Scripps Company

References 
 AEJMC Archives – September 1997, week 4 (#55) at list.msu.edu
 Manuscript Collection at www.library.ohiou.edu
 
 Chamber History: Business Leaders, 1903-2003 at www.detroitchamber.com
 Silver Buffalo Award at www.dacbsa.org

American newspaper publishers (people)
Businesspeople from Detroit
1858 births
1930 deaths
Wayne State University alumni
19th-century American businesspeople
Presidents of the Boy Scouts of America